The I Train may refer to:

 The I Train, a Finnish railway service; see Hiekkaharju railway station
 The nickname of American football player Israel Idonije